Volodymyr Pryyomov (born 2 January 1986) is a Ukrainian professional footballer who plays as a forward.

Career

Priyomov started his career with Energie Cottbus in Germany.

He is a former Ukraine national under-21 football team player.

Honours 
Skoruk Tomakivka
 Dnipropetrovsk Oblast Championship: 2020–21

Persepolis
 Persian Gulf Pro League: 2016–17

Oleksandriya
 Ukrainian First League: 2010–11

Shakhtar Donetsk
 Ukrainian Premier League: 2007–08
 Ukrainian Cup: 2008
 Ukrainian Super Cup: 2008
 UEFA Cup: 2008–09

Ivan Odesa
 Odesa Oblast cup: 2004

Vitebsk
 Belarusian Cup: Runner-Up 2018–19

References

External links
 Photos of Priyomov 
 
 Profile on Eurosport
 
 

1986 births
Living people
People from Sambir
Sportspeople from Lviv Oblast
Ukrainian footballers
Association football forwards
Ukrainian expatriate footballers
Expatriate footballers in Germany
Expatriate footballers in Russia
Expatriate footballers in Iran
Expatriate footballers in Singapore
Expatriate footballers in Brunei
Expatriate footballers in Belarus
Expatriate footballers in Estonia
Ukrainian expatriate sportspeople in Germany
Ukrainian expatriate sportspeople in Russia
Ukrainian expatriate sportspeople in Iran
Ukrainian expatriate sportspeople in Brunei
Ukrainian expatriate sportspeople in Belarus
Ukrainian expatriate sportspeople in Estonia
Ukrainian Premier League players
Ukrainian First League players
Ukrainian Second League players
Ukrainian Amateur Football Championship players
Russian Premier League players
Persian Gulf Pro League players
Meistriliiga players
FC Energie Cottbus II players
FC Ivan Odesa players
FC Saturn Ramenskoye players
FC Metalurh Donetsk players
FC Shakhtar Donetsk players
FC Chornomorets Odesa players
FC Krymteplytsia Molodizhne players
FC Oleksandriya players
PFC Krylia Sovetov Samara players
FC Kryvbas Kryvyi Rih players
FC Metalurh Zaporizhzhia players
FC Metalist Kharkiv players
Persepolis F.C. players
FC Olimpik Donetsk players
DPMM FC players
FC Vitebsk players
FC Sumy players
FC Skoruk Tomakivka players
FC Balkany Zorya players
SC Tavriya Simferopol players
JK Narva Trans players